The Calgary version of the NWA Canadian Heavyweight Championship was established in 1946, and became the top championship in Stampede Wrestling when that promotion opened in 1948; it held that status until 1972, when the title was vacated and later abandoned after the last champion, Dave Ruhl, was injured.

Title history

Footnotes

References

National Wrestling Alliance championships
Canadian Heavyweight
Heavyweight wrestling championships
Canadian professional wrestling championships
Professional wrestling in Alberta